The molecular formula C18H28N2O3S (molar mass: 352.49 g/mol, exact mass: 352.1821 u) may refer to:

 Almokalant, a potassium channel blocker used to treat arrhythmia
 SB-269,970